Rogers Plaza is an enclosed shopping mall in Wyoming, Michigan, a suburb of Grand Rapids, Michigan. Opened in 1961, it was the first shopping mall in Western Michigan and the first enclosed one in the state of Michigan. The center features Planet Fitness and Citi Trends among its major stores.

History
Built in 1960, the mall originally included S. S. Kresge and W. T. Grant variety stores, Kroger and A&P supermarkets, Cunningham Drug, and Montgomery Ward. An adjacent development, Southland Plaza (now Wyoming Village Mall), opened one year later with a Wurzburg's department store. Mall developers were initially unsuccessful in attracting a department store for the eastern anchor, but by 1971, a Turn Style discount store had opened on the east end. This store was the subject of a lawsuit from Kresge. Into the late 1980s, the Stannard's Music store was one of the first stores in the area to introduce the public to the MIDI, giving seminars on the capability of the device.

By the 1990s, the mall was having difficulty attracting business. In 1990, the mall's east anchor had become Best Products and in 1990 and 1991, the mall held a "Haunted Hotel" event, sponsored by Easter Seals, near Halloween. In 1991, a fire in the Best store resulted in three people hospitalized for smoke inhalation. In 1994, Office Max became a tenant replacing Bargain Books, with the bookstore moving into a smaller space. while Gantos, a boutique, closed. In 1998, a United States Postal Service store opened in the center of the mall. Rogers Plaza had a total of 30 retail stores in 1999 with the mall "filling up fast", with the former space used by Best being filled. However, much of the mall's business was taken by the newly opened Rivertown Crossings Mall in Grandville.

Into the 2000s, Ward's closed in December 2000 with 140 employees losing their jobs while the mall was sold in May 2000 to a new owner. In 2001 and 2002, the mall underwent a 14-month renovation project. As part of the renovation, the vacated Montgomery Ward was demolished for a Family Fare supermarket and AJ Wright discount store. In 2002, a redevelopment plan presented by the City of Wyoming included a street leading west from the mall, across Michael Avenue through Wyoming Village Mall and ending at Studio 28, with businesses and apartments anticipated to be constructed along the street. The project never launched as the owners of Wyoming Village Mall disagreed with demolishing a portion of their mall for the street.

AJ Wright closed in February 2011 and became CW Price in August of the same year. The mall was purchased by Sun Valley Ltd. in June 2012. At the time, other major tenants included Big Lots, Harbor Freight Tools, Citi Trends, and OfficeMax. In June 2019, Family Fare was closed down and the space is going to be auctioned off while OfficeMax closed shortly after.

References

Shopping malls in Michigan
Shopping malls established in 1960
Tourist attractions in Grand Rapids, Michigan
Buildings and structures in Grand Rapids, Michigan
Economy of Grand Rapids, Michigan
1961 establishments in Michigan